Tosini is a surname. Notable people with the surname include:

 Jennifer Tosini (born 1968), American lawyer and politician
 Michele Tosini (1503–1577), Italian painter 
 Fabrizio Tosini (born 1969), Italian bobsledder

Italian-language surnames